Jordan Taalolo Ta'amu-Perifanos (born December 10, 1997) is an American football quarterback for the DC Defenders of the XFL. He played college football for Ole Miss. Ta'amu has been a member of several National Football League (NFL) teams and has started for the St. Louis BattleHawks of the XFL and Tampa Bay Bandits of the United States Football League (USFL). With the Bandits, he led the 2022 USFL season in passing yardage and touchdowns.

Early life and college
Ta'amu attended the Pearl City High School in Pearl City, Hawaii. As a senior, he passed for 1,779 yards with 29 touchdowns against four interceptions.

Ta'amu played at the New Mexico Military Institute for two seasons, passing for 3,014 yards and 32 touchdowns as a sophomore. He transferred to Ole Miss in 2017, entering the season as the backup to Shea Patterson before taking over as the starter for the final five games after Patterson suffered an injury. He finished the season with 1,682 passing yards, 11 touchdowns and 4 interceptions. He also rushed for 165 yards and 4 touchdowns. With Patterson transferring to the University of Michigan, Ta'amu entered the 2018 season as the starting quarterback. In his senior season he passed for 3,918 yards, 19 touchdowns and 8 interceptions. He also rushed for 342 yards and 6 touchdowns. He finished the season ranked second in SEC passing yards, behind Alabama's Tua Tagovailoa, who played in three more games.

Professional career

Houston Texans
On August 7, 2019, Ta’amu signed with the Houston Texans; he was released on August 30, 2019.

St. Louis BattleHawks
On October 15, 2019, Ta'amu was allocated to the St. Louis BattleHawks of the XFL, the first player for the team. He is the only one of the XFL's first eight quarterbacks to not have any professional regular season experience. He signed a contract with the team on November 4, 2019. On January 29, 2020, Ta'amu was named the starting quarterback.

During the BattleHawks first game against the Dallas Renegades on February 9, Ta'amu threw for 209 yards and a passing touchdown, while rushing for 77 yards, helping the team win a 15–9 victory against the Renegades. He had another productive game in Week 2 against the Houston Roughnecks, with 316 combined yards of offense and four total touchdowns, but threw 2 interceptions as the Battlehawks lost 24–28. After the XFL's season was cut short, Ta'amu was placed on the reserve/other league list on April 2, 2020, in order to sign with the Kansas City Chiefs. He had his contract terminated when the league suspended operations on April 10, 2020.

Kansas City Chiefs
Ta’amu signed with the Kansas City Chiefs on April 2, 2020. On September 5, 2020, he was waived. He was signed to the practice squad the following day. On October 3, 2020, he tested positive for COVID-19 and was placed on the practice squad/COVID-19 reserve list. He was removed from the COVID-19 list on October 21. He was released on October 27.

Detroit Lions
On December 16, 2020, Ta'amu was signed to the Detroit Lions' practice squad.

Kansas City Chiefs (second stint)
Ta'amu was signed to a reserve/future contract on January 12, 2021. He was waived on May 10, 2021.

Detroit Lions (second stint)
Ta'amu signed with the Detroit Lions on August 17, 2021. He was cut six days later on August 23, 2021.

Washington Football Team

On December 15, 2021, Ta'amu was signed to the Washington Football Team's practice squad, but was released eight days later. During this time the starting quarterback for Washington was Taylor Heinicke, who was Ta’amu’s back up in the XFL.

Carolina Panthers
On December 30, 2021, Ta'amu was signed to the Carolina Panthers practice squad. He was released on January 4, 2022.

Tampa Bay Bandits
Ta'amu was selected with the second pick of the 2022 USFL Draft by the Tampa Bay Bandits. He would lead the USFL in passing yards at 2,014 and touchdowns with 14.

DC Defenders
Ta'amu was assigned to the DC Defenders of the XFL on January 6, 2023.

Statistics

References

External links

Ole Miss Rebels bio

1997 births
Living people
American football quarterbacks
Detroit Lions players
Houston Texans players
New Mexico Military Institute Broncos football players
Ole Miss Rebels football players
St. Louis BattleHawks players
People from Pearl City, Hawaii
Players of American football from Hawaii
Kansas City Chiefs players
American sportspeople of Samoan descent
Washington Football Team players
Carolina Panthers players
Tampa Bay Bandits (2022) players
DC Defenders players